Will Tucker (born 16 March 1998 in New Zealand) is a New Zealand rugby union player who plays for Rugby New York in Major League Rugby (MLR). His playing position is lock. He was announced in the Highlanders touring squad of South Africa and Argentina in March 2020.

Reference list

External links
itsrugby.co.uk profile

1998 births
New Zealand rugby union players
Living people
Rugby union locks
Canterbury rugby union players
Highlanders (rugby union) players
Otago rugby union players
Rugby New York players